The 2021 Summit League baseball tournament took place from May 27 through 29.  The top four regular-season finishers of the league's six teams met in the double-elimination tournament held at Tal Anderson Field on the campus of the University of Nebraska Omaha in Omaha, Nebraska.  The winner of the tournament, North Dakota State, earned the Summit League's automatic bid to the 2021 NCAA Division I baseball tournament.

Seeding
The top four finishers from the regular season were seeded one through four based on conference winning percentage during the double round-robin regular season.  The teams then played a double-elimination tournament.

Results

All-Tournament Team
The following players were named to the all-tournament team:

References

Tournament
2021
2021 in sports in Nebraska
May 2021 sports events in the United States
Baseball competitions in Omaha, Nebraska